Stephen Dau is an American-Belgian writer.

His debut novel is The Book of Jonas published in 2012, which was a finalist for the First Novelist Award and was named one of the best books of the year by Kirkus Reviews, Booklist and The Wall Street Journal. Originally from Western Pennsylvania (Pittsburgh), he lives in Brussels, Belgium. His work has appeared in Ploughshares, The Pittsburgh Post-Gazette, The North Atlantic Review, McSweeney's, and on MSNBC.com.

Early life and education 

Dau was born in Greensburg, Pennsylvania. 
He graduated from the University of Pittsburgh and attended the M.A. in Writing program at Johns Hopkins University before receiving an MFA in Writing from Bennington College.

Dau worked for 10 years in the post-Yugoslav Wars reconstruction of Eastern Europe and Bosnia.  He lives in Brussels, Belgium.

Novels 

 The Book of Jonas Penguin Group USA

Notes

External links

North American Travel Journalists Association Awards Page
Article by Stephen Dau on nbcnews.com
Review at BookPage by WS Lyon of The Book of Jonas, 2012

Living people
University of Pittsburgh alumni
Writers from Pittsburgh
American male novelists
Novelists from Pennsylvania
Year of birth missing (living people)
21st-century American novelists
21st-century American male writers